Woodworthia is a genus of geckos in the family Diplodactylidae endemic to New Zealand. It includes three species: All species are native to New Zealand.
Woodworthia brunnea  – Canterbury gecko
Woodworthia chrysosiretica  – gold-striped gecko, gold-stripe gecko, or golden sticky-toed gecko
Woodworthia maculata  – New Zealand common gecko or Raukawa gecko

References

 
Reptiles of New Zealand
Lizard genera
Taxa named by Samuel Garman